Desmond Williams may refer to:

 Desmond Williams (musician),  American electronica musician and record producer
 Desmond Williams (architect), British architect
 Desmond Williams (bishop), Irish Roman Catholic bishop
 Desmond Williams (boxer), Sierra Leonean boxer
 Thomas Desmond Williams, Irish historian

See also
 Des Williams, South African boxer